Admiral Ellis may refer to:

Abraham George Ellis (1846–1916), Royal Netherlands Navy vice admiral 
Edward Ellis (Royal Navy officer) (1918–2002), British Royal Navy rear admiral
James O. Ellis (born 1947), U.S. Navy admiral
William Edward Ellis (1908–1982), U.S. Navy vice admiral